The Punjai Siva Temple, or Naltunai Ishvaram Temple, is a Hindu temple located at Punjai near Semponnarkoil. The principal deity is Nataraja, a form of the Hindu god Shiva.

Location
The temple is located in the village of Punjai at a distance of 6 kilometres from Semponnarkoil. Near to poombukar tourist place. This temple  constructed in the period of Rajendra cholan.

Architecture 
The temple is famous for its architecture. The principal idol of Nataraja is made of bronze and was carved in about 1000 AD.

Notes 

Shiva temples in Mayiladuthurai district